Eocithara is an extinct genus of sea snails, marine gastropod mollusks, in the family Harpidae.

Species
Species within the genus Eocithara include:
 † Eocithara elegans (Deshayes, 1835) 
 † Eocithara eucosmia Merle & Pacaud, 2004 
 † Eocithara helenae Merle & Pacaud, 2004 
 † Eocithara jacksonensis (G. D. Harris, 1896) 
 † Eocithara lamellifera (Tate, 1889) 
 † Eocithara mutica (Lamarck, 1803) 
 † Eocithara rosenkrantzi Merle & Pacaud, 2004 
 † Eocithara submutica (d'Orbigny, 1852) 
 † Eocithara waihaoensis Laws, 1935

References

 Cossmann (M.) & Pissarro (G.), 1913 Iconographie complète des coquilles fossiles de l'Éocène des environs de Paris, t. 2, p. pl. 46-65
 Laws, C. R. (1935). New Eocene Mollusca from New Zealand. Transactions of the Royal Society of New Zealand. 65: 23-29.
 Termier (H.) & Termier (G.), 1960 Paléontologie stratigraphique. Quatrième fascicule: Eocène-Oligocène-Miocène-Pliocène- Quaternaire et index général, p. 359-512
 Le Renard (J.) & Pacaud (J.-M.), 1995 Révision des Mollusques paléogènes du Bassin de Paris. 2 - Liste des références primaires des espèces. Cossmanniana, t. 3, vol. 3, p. 65-132
 Merle (D.) & Pacaud (J.-M.), 2004 New species of Eocithara Fischer, 1883 (Mollusca, Gastropoda, Harpidae) from the Early Paleogene with phylogenetic analysis of the Harpidae. Geodiversitas, t. 26, vol. 1, p. 61-87

External links
 Fischer P. (1880-1887). Manuel de Conchyliologie et de Paléontologie Conchyliologique. Paris, Savy pp. XXIV + 1369 + pl. 23.
 Rehder H.A. (1973). The family Harpidae of the world. Indo-Pacific Mollusca 3(16) : 207-274
 Merle D. & Pacaud J.-M. (2004). New species of Eocithara Fischer, 1883 (Mollusca, Gastropoda, Harpidae) from the Early Paleogene with phylogenetic analysis of the Harpidae. Geodiversitas. 26(1) : 61-87

 
Gastropods described in 1883